The Algonquin people are an Indigenous people who now live in Eastern Canada. They speak the Algonquin language, which is part of the Algonquian language family. Culturally and linguistically, they are closely related to the Odawa, Potawatomi, Ojibwe (including Oji-Cree), Mississaugas, and Nipissing, with whom they form the larger Anicinàpe (Anishinaabeg). Algonquins call themselves Omàmiwinini (plural: Omàmiwininiwak) or the more generalised name of Anicinàpe.

Though known by several names in the past, such as Algoumequin, the most common term "Algonquin" has been suggested to derive from the Maliseet word : "they are our relatives/allies." The much larger heterogeneous group of Algonquian-speaking peoples, who, according to Brian Conwell, stretch from Virginia to the Rocky Mountains and north to Hudson Bay, was named after the tribe.

Most Algonquins live in Quebec. The nine recognized status Algonquin bands in that province and one in Ontario have a combined population of about 17,002. In addition, there are additional non-status communities, some of which are controversial. Algonquins are original Indigenous People of southern Quebec and eastern Ontario in Canada. 

Many Algonquins still speak the Algonquin language, called generally  or specifically . The language is considered one of several divergent dialects of the Anishinaabe languages. Among younger speakers, the Algonquin language has experienced strong word borrowings from the Cree language.
Traditionally, the Algonquins lived in either birch bark or wooden mìkiwàms. Today Algonquins live in housings like those of the general public.

Traditionally, the Algonquins were practitioners of Midewiwin (the Path of the Heart). They believed they were surrounded by many manitòk or spirits in the natural world. French missionaries converted many Algonquins to Catholicism in the 17th and 18th centuries. Today, many Algonquin practice traditional Midewiwin or a syncretic merging of Christianity and Midewiwin.

In the oral history of the Great Anishinaabeg Migration, the Algonquins say they migrated from the Atlantic coast. Together with other Anicinàpek, they arrived at the "First Stopping Place" near Montreal. While the other Anicinàpe peoples continued their journey up the St. Lawrence River, the Algonquins settled along Kitcisìpi (the Ottawa River), a long-important highway for commerce, cultural exchange and transportation. Algonquin identity, though, was not fully realized until after the dividing of the Anicinàpek at the "Third Stopping Place". Scholars have used the oral histories, archeology, and linguistics to estimate this took place about 2000 years ago, near present-day Detroit.

After contact with the Europeans, especially the French and Dutch, the Algonquin nations became active in the fur trade. This led them to fight against the powerful Iroquois, whose confederacy was based in present-day New York. In 1570, the Algonquins formed an alliance with the Innu (Montagnais) to the east, whose territory extended to the ocean. Culturally, Omàmìwininì (Algonquin) and the Mississaugas (Michi Saagiig) were not part of the Ojibwe–Odawa–Potawatomi alliance known as the Council of Three Fires, though they did maintain close ties. Omàmìwininìwak (Algonquins) maintained stronger cultural ties with the Wendat, Abenaki, Atikamekw, and Cree, along with the Innu, as related above.

French contact

  Algonquin first met Europeans when Samuel de Champlain came upon a party led by the  Chief Tessouat at Tadoussac, in eastern present-day Quebec, in the summer of 1603. They were celebrating a recent victory over the Iroquois, with the allied Montagnais and Etchemins (Malecite). Champlain did not understand that Algonquins were socially united by a strong totem/clan system rather than the European-styled political concept of nationhood. The several Algonquin bands each had its own chief. Within each band, the chief depended on political approval from each of the band's clan leaders. Champlain needed to cultivate relationships with numerous chiefs and clan leaders. From 1603, some of the Algonquins allied with the French under Champlain. This alliance proved useful to the Algonquin, who previously had little to no access to European firearms.

Champlain made his first exploration of the Ottawa River during May 1613 and reached the fortified  village at Morrison Island. Unlike the other Algonquin communities, the  did not change location with the seasons. They had chosen a strategic point astride the trade route between the Great Lakes and the St. Lawrence River. They prospered through the collection of beaver pelts from Indigenous traders passing through their territory. They also were proud of their corn fields.

At first, the French used the term "Algonquin" only for a second group, the Wàwàckeciriniwak. However, by 1615, they applied the name to all of the Algonquin bands living along the Ottawa River. These two large groups allied together, under the leadership of Sachem (Carolus) Charles Pachirini, to maintain the  identity and territory.

French-Indian War/Seven Years' War

The Iroquois Confederacy (Haudenosaunee) drove Algonquins from their lands. The Haudenosaunee were aided by having been traded arms by the Dutch, and later by the English. The Haudenosaunee and the English defeated the French and Algonquins in the 1620s, and, led by Sir David Kirke, occupied New France.

In 1623, having realized the occupation of New France demonstrated French colonial vulnerability, the French began to trade muskets to Algonquins and their allies. French Jesuits began to seek Algonquin conversions to Roman Catholicism.

Through all of these years, the Haudenosaunee never attacked the  fortress. But, in 1642, they made a surprise winter raid, attacking Algonquins while most of their warriors were absent, and causing severe casualties. On March 6, 1647 (Ash Wednesday), a large Kanienkehaka (Mohawk) war party attacked the  living near Trois-Rivières and almost exterminated them. The  were still at Morrison Island in 1650 and inspired respect with their 400 warriors. When the French retreated from Wendat (Huron) country that year, Tessouat was reported to have had the superior of the Jesuit mission suspended by his armpits because he refused to offer him the customary presents for being allowed to travel through Algonquin territory.

Some joined the mission at Sillery, where they were mostly destroyed by an infectious disease epidemic by 1676. Encouraged by the French, others remained at Trois-Rivières. Their settlement at nearby Pointe-du-Lac continued until about 1830. That year the last 14 families, numbering about 50, moved to Kanesatake near Oka. (The families who stayed in Trois Rivieres can be found in the Algonquin census of Trois Rivieres in the mid-19th century).

History 18th Century to Present

The Lake of Two Mountains band of Algonquins were located just west of the Island of Montreal, and were signatories to the Great Peace of Montreal in 1701. The Sulpician Mission of the Mountain was founded at Montreal in 1677.

In 1717, the King of France granted the Mohawk in Quebec a tract of land 9 miles long by 9 miles wide about 40 miles to the northwest of Montreal, under the condition that they leave the island of Montreal. Sulpician Missionaries set up a trading post at the village in 1721 and attracted a large number of Haudenosaunee converts to Christianity to the area. The settlement of Kanesatake was formally founded as a Catholic mission, a seigneury under the supervision of the Sulpician Order for 300 Christian Mohawk, about 100 Algonquins, and approximately 250 Nipissing peoples "in their care". Over time the Sulpicians claimed total control of the land, gaining a deed that gave them legal title. But the Haudenosaunee (Mohawks), Algonquins, and Nipissing understood that this land was being held in trust for them.

The Sulpician mission village of Lake of Two Mountains (Lac des Deux Montagnes), west of Montreal, became known both by its Algonquin language name Oka (meaning "pickerel"), and the Mohawk language Kanehsatà:ke ("sandy place"); however, Algonquin also called the village as Ganashtaageng after the Mohawk language name.

Algonquin warriors continued to fight in alliance with France until the British conquest of Quebec in 1760, during the Seven Years' War. After the British took over colonial rule of Canada, their officials sought to make allies of the First Nations, and the Algonquin, along with many other First Nations signed the Royal Proclamation of 1763, which was then ratified in 1764 as the Treaty of Niagara. Subsequently, fighting on behalf of the British Crown, Algonquins took part in the Barry St Leger campaign during the American Revolutionary War.

Following the American Revolutionary War, and later the War of 1812, the Lake of Two Mountains Algonquins found their territory increasingly encroached on by Loyalist settlers. Beginning in the 1820s and 1930s, the lumber industry began to move up the Ottawa valley. Algonquin became increasingly displaced as a result. Beginning in the 1820s, Algonquin Grand Chief Constant Pinesi sent a series of letters petitioning the British Crown for Algonquin Territorial Recognition previously agreed upon in the Treaties of 1701 and 1764, ratified by Algonquins and the British Crown. No responses were forthcoming from the British, and the Algonquins began to be relegated to a string of small reserves beginning in the 1830s.

Algonquins who agreed to move to these reserves or joined other historical bands were federally "recognized". Others maintained their attachment to the traditional territory and fur trading, and chose not to re-locate. These Algonquins were later called "stragglers" in the Ottawa and Pontiac counties with some eventually settling in small towns such as Renfrew, Whitney, and Eganville as the 19th Century progressed. Many of these Algonquins were not recognized as "Status Indians".

The location of the former Lake of Two Mountains Band came to be known as Kahnesatake. As a large majority of the Algonquin population had left the area, with only the Christian Haudenosaunee and a few Algonquins remaining, it became recognized as a Mohawk reserve (though many in the community have at least partial Algonquin Ancestry).

Algonquins living in the northern regions of Algonquin Territory gradually moved to towns such as present day Témiscaming, and Mattawa, amongst others in Ontario and Quebec, as territorial encroachment by settlers, and lumber and resource companies increased throughout the 19th and 20th Centuries or various reserves set up in their traditional territories.

Economy

Historical Algonquin society was largely hunting and fishing-based. Being primarily a hunting nation, the people emphasized mobility. They used materials that were light and easy to transport. Canoes were made of birch bark, sewed with spruce roots and rendered waterproof by the application of heated spruce resin and bear grease. During winter, toboggans were used to transport material, and people used snowshoes to get around. The women used  (cradleboards) to carry their babies. It was built with wood and covered with an envelope made of leather or material. The baby was standing up with his feet resting on a small board. The mother would then put the tikinàgan on her back. This allowed the infant to look around and observe his surroundings. The child was kept close to the mother but also had much stimulation.

Algonquian-speaking people also practiced agriculture, particularly south of the Great Lakes, where the climate allows for a longer growing season. Notable indigenous crops historically farmed by Algonquins are the sunflower and tobacco. Around 800CE, Eastern Algonquins adopted maize agriculture from their neighbors in the interior. Even among groups who mainly hunted, agricultural products were an important source of food. They obtained what was needed by trading with or raiding societies that practiced more agriculture. Eastern Algonquins created pots that could withstand not only thermal stress but the mechanical stress of rough use.

Archaeological sites on Morrison Island near Pembroke, within the territory of the later , reveal a 1,000-year-old culture that manufactured copper tools and weapons. Copper ore was extracted north of Lake Superior and distributed down to present-day northern New York. Local pottery artifacts from this period show widespread similarities that indicate the continuing use of the river for cultural exchange throughout the Canadian Shield and beyond.

Beginning at the latest in c. 1 CE, the Algonquin Nation inhabited the islands and shores along Kitcisìpi (Algonquin Language name translating to The Great River, known now as the Ottawa River). By the 17th century European Explorers found them well established as a hunter-gatherer society in control of the river. The  showed entrepreneurial spirit. On Morrison Island, at the location where 5,000-year-old copper artifacts were discovered, the  band levied a toll on canoe flotillas descending the river.

Ethnobotany
Algonquins of Quebec gather the berries of Ribes glandulosum and Viburnum nudum var. cassinoides as food, and eat and sell the fruit of Vaccinium myrtilloides.
They take an infusion of Epigaea repens leaves for kidney disorders and apply a poultice of the gum or needles of Abies balsamea to open sores, insect bites, boils and infections. The needles are a sudatory for women after childbirth and are infused for a laxative tea, while the roots treat heart disease.

Modern events

In recent years, tensions with the lumber industry have flared up again among Algonquin communities, in response to the practice of clear-cutting.

In Ontario, an Algonquin land claim has been ongoing since 1983, encompassing much of the southeastern part of the province, stretching from near North Bay to near Hawkesbury and including Ottawa, Pembroke, and most of Algonquin Provincial Park. The Algonquins never relinquished title to this area. An agreement-in-principle between the Algonquins of Ontario, the Government of Canada and the Government of Ontario was reached in 2015. Many Algonquins dispute both the validity of both this settlement and the organization of the Algonquins of Ontario as a whole.

In 2000, Algonquins from Timiskaming First Nation played a significant part in the local popular opposition to the plan to convert Adams Mine into a garbage dump.

Communities
At the time of their first meeting with the French in 1603, the various Algonquin bands probably had a combined population somewhere in the neighborhood of 6,000. The British estimate in 1768 was 1,500. As of 2000, there are close to 8,000 Algonquins in Canada, organized into ten separate First Nations: nine in Quebec and one in Ontario.

Historic
Algonquian Nations documented as early as 1630:

Quebec
 Kichesipirini ("people of the great river") — They were the largest and most powerful group of Algonquins. Their main village was on Morrison Island.
 Kinounchepirini ("people of the Pickerel-waters") — Also known as Keinouche, Kinouchebiiriniwek, Kinònjepìriniwak, Kinonche, Pickerel, Pike and Quenongebin. Sometimes they were listed as an Algonquian band, but after 1650 they were associated with the Ottawa and were originally found along the lower Ottawa River below Allumette Island.
 Otaguottaouemin — Also known as Kotakoutouemi or Outaoukotwemiwek. They were located along the Upper Ottawa River above Allumette Island.
 Sàgaiganininiwak ("people of the lake") — Also known as Saghiganirini.
 Saginitaouigama — Also known as Sagachiganiriniwek.
 Weskarini ("people of the deer[-clan]") — Also known as the Wàwàckeciriniwak, Little Nation, Ouaouechkairini, Ouassouarini, Ouescharini,  (Wyandot language), or Petite Nation. Their traditional home land is located on the north side of the Ottawa River along the Lievre River and the Rouge River in Quebec.

Ontario
 Matàwackariniwak "people of the bulrushed-shore" — Also known as Madawaska, Madwaska, Matouchkarine, Matouashita, Mataouchkarini, Matouechkariniwek and Matouescarini; the Madawaska River in the Upper Ottawa Valley is named after this band.
 Nibachis — Located at Muskrat Lake near present-day Cobden, Ontario.

Contemporary

Status nations in Quebec
 Kitigan Zibi Anishinabeg, Kitigan Zibi near Maniwaki (population 3,237)
 Timiskaming First Nation, Notre-Dame-du-Nord, Quebec (population 2,129)
 Nation Anishinabe du Lac Simon, Lac-Simon, Quebec (population 2,149)
 Conseil de la Première Nation Abitibiwinn, Pikogan, Quebec (population 1,059)
 Eagle Village First Nation, Témiscaming, Quebec (population 991)
 Long Point First Nation, Winneway River, Quebec (population 866)
 Algonquins of Barrière Lake, Lac Rapide (population 791)
 Kitcisakik Anicinape Community, Val-d'Or, Quebec (population 494)
 Wolf Lake First Nation, Témiscaming, Quebec (population 232) — formed from three historical bands:
 Dumoine Lake Band of Algonquin, (historical)
 Grassy Lake Band of Algonquin, (historical)
 Lac des Quinze Band of Algonquin, (historical)

Status nations in Ontario
 Matachewan First Nation, Matachewan, Ontario (population 787) — formed in part by Algonquins
 Temagami First Nation, Temagami, Ontario (population 841) — formed in part by Algonquins
 Wahgoshig First Nation, Black River-Matheson, Ontario (population 332) — formed in part by Algonquins
 Algonquins of Pikwàkanagàn First Nation, Golden Lake, Ontario (population 2,635)

See also
 Eliot Indian Bible
 Great Trail
 Kingdom of Saguenay

References

Further reading

 Daniel Clément, The Algonquins. Hull, Quebec: Canadian Museum of Civilization, 1996.
 Yvon H. Couture, Les Algonquins. Val d'Or, Quebec: Éditions Hyperborée, 1983.
 Robert Michael Morrissey, Empire by Collaboration: Indians, Colonists, and Governments in Colonial Illinois Country. Philadelphia, PA: University of Pennsylvania Press, 2015.
 Evan T. Pritchard, No Word for Time: The Way of the Algonquin People. Tulsa, OK: Council Oak Books, 1997.
 Richard White, The Middle Ground: Indians, Empires, and Republics in the Great Lakes Region, 1650-1815. Cambridge, England: Cambridge University Press, 1991.

External links
 Algonquin Nation
 Ardoch Algonguin First Nation's website
  Ottawa Algonquin First Nation's website 
 The Bonnechere Algonquin Community's website
 Kichesipirini Algonquin First Nation
 Tanakiwin - Algonquin Nation in present-day Ontario, Canada
 History of the Algonkin
 Algonquin Language sample
 Watch the documentary Ojigkwanong - Encounter with an Algonquin Sage

 
 
Anishinaabe groups
Algonquian peoples
First Nations in Ontario
First Nations in Quebec
Algonquian ethnonyms